Marked by Fire (first published January 1, 1982) is a novel by Joyce Carol Thomas.  Thomas and Paula Fox (A Place Apart) shared the 1983 National Book Award for Children's Books in category Fiction, Paperback.

The story follows the life of Abyssinia "Abby" Jackson, whose home in Oklahoma is destroyed by a tornado and fire. Her father's name was Strong and her mother's Patience.

Notes

References

American children's novels
National Book Award for Young People's Literature winning works
Novels set in Oklahoma
1982 American novels
1982 children's books
American Book Award-winning works